Butterleigh is a village and civil parish in Mid Devon, England situated about three miles south east of Tiverton. The village includes a public house, village hall, award-winning blacksmith and is famous for its harvest home.

St Matthew's Church
The parish church of St Matthew has a 13th-century baptismal font, and an alms box predating King Charles I.

Monuments
In the church of St Matthew is a mural monument to Elizabeth Courtenay (d.1624), a daughter of Philip III Courtenay (1547-1611) of Molland by his wife Joane Boyes (d.1586), daughter of John Boyes of Kent. Elizabeth married in 1600 to the Hollander Peter Muden, a doctor of medicine, of Butterleigh. Shortly before 1600 Muden had enlarged the parish church and later erected the existing mural monument to his wife which contains a female effigy between two children with verse.

External links

References

Villages in Mid Devon District
Civil parishes in Devon